Webster County Schools is a public school district serving Webster County, West Virginia, with its main office located in Webster Springs.

Board of Education
Webster County Schools is under the supervision of the elected Webster County Board of Education

Schools

High schools
Webster County High School, Upperglade

Elementary schools
Hacker Valley Elementary, Hacker Valley
Glade Elementary School, Cowen
Webster Springs Elementary, Webster Springs

Former schools
Cowen High School
Webster Springs High School
Glade Middle School
Diana Elementary School

References

External links
Official Website

School districts in West Virginia
Education in Webster County, West Virginia